This is a partial list of molecules that contain 15 carbon atoms.

See also
 Carbon number 
 List of compounds with carbon number 14
 List of compounds with carbon number 16

C15